Svend Erik Studsgaard (28 January 1947 – 15 September 2022) was a Danish wrestler. He competed in the men's Greco-Roman 100 kg at the 1980 Summer Olympics.

References

External links
 

1947 births
2022 deaths
Danish male sport wrestlers
Olympic wrestlers of Denmark
Wrestlers at the 1980 Summer Olympics
People from Frederikshavn
Sportspeople from the North Jutland Region